Exapion is a genus of straight-snouted weevils.

Species include:
Exapion formaniki
Exapion fuscirostre - Scotch broom seed weevil
Exapion malvae
Exapion putoni
Exapion ulicis - gorse seed weevil

Several Exapion species were formerly included in genus Apion.

References

External links 
 
 CTD species list

Brentidae